Zbigniew Czesław Wóycicki (June 1, 1902 – April 2, 1928) was a Polish military officer and skier.

Wóycicki was born in Zakopane. He was the leader of the national Olympic military patrol team at the 1924 and 1928 Winter Olympics. In 1924, when the Polish team was one of two which withdrew owing to bad weather conditions, he was the youngest participant. In 1928 he had the rank of a Porucznik, and finished with his team seventh. He died in his hometown in the same year.

References

External links 
 Zbigniew Wóycicki bei Sports Reference

1902 births
1928 deaths
Polish military patrol (sport) runners
Military patrol competitors at the 1924 Winter Olympics
Military patrol competitors at the 1928 Winter Olympics
Olympic biathletes of Poland
Sportspeople from Zakopane